PJTV (Parijz van Java TV) is a local private television station in Bandung, West Java, owned by Jawa Pos Group and affiliated with JPM. Many programs are in Sundanese, but PJTV also airs in Indonesian. PJTV consists of news, local culture, comedy and quiz. PJTV is on from 05.00 am until 12.00 am.

History 
The station begun broadcasting on 2005 as Padjadjaran TV by PT Esa Visual Padjadjaran TiVi. On 15 April 2010, Padjadjaran TV changed its name into PJTV.

Starting 8 September 2017, PJTV together with another four local television stations across West Java (Cianjur's CB Channel, Sumedang's SMTV, Majalengka's Jatiwangi TV and Kuningan's TVK) changed their respective name to SKTV (Sunda Kiwari Televisi, Sunda Today Television). The change coincides with the cultural dialogue event Sunda Kiwari dalam Perspektif Indonesia (Sunda Today in Indonesia's Perspective) which airs at 7 p.m. WIB. However, in August 2018 the name was reverted to PJTV.

External links
 PJTV official website

Television stations in Indonesia
Mass media in Bandung
Television channels and stations established in 2005